The Kitchen is a 1961 British drama film directed by James Hill and starring Carl Möhner, Mary Yeomans, Brian Phelan, Tom Bell, Eric Pohlmann and James Bolam. The film follows the dozen staff in a restaurant's kitchen during the course of one busy morning. The script is based on the 1957 stage play of the same name by Arnold Wesker. The film was produced by Sidney Cole for Act Films Ltd.

It features a musical interlude when all the staff dance to a song: "What's Cookin'" by Adam Faith.

There is no particular plot and it simply looks at the various relationships between different staff members. The kitchen staff is almost exclusively male and the waiting staff is exclusively female.

The presence of one new member of staff allows each person to be introduced in turn. The owner wanders around checking things. The story looks at the bickering between staff, petty thievery, and rather excessive drinking of more than one staff member.

Cast

 Carl Möhner as Peter
 Mary Yeomans as Monica
 Brian Phelan as Kevin
 Tom Bell as Paul
 Howard Greene as Raymond 
 Eric Pohlmann as Mr Marango the owner
 James Bolam as Michael
 Scott Finch as Hans  
 Gertan Klauber as Gaston  
 Martin Boddey as Max 
 Sean Lynch as Dimitri  
 Josef Behrmann as Magi  
 George Eugeniou as Nick  
 Frank Pettitt as Frank  
 Charles Lloyd-Pack as Chef  
 Frank Atkinson as Alfred
 Rosalind Knight as Waitress

References

External links
 

1961 films
1961 drama films
British drama films
1960s English-language films
Films directed by James Hill (British director)
British films based on plays
1960s British films